Rohit Kumar is an Indian professional rower. He won the bronze medal in Men's Lightweight Double Sculls along with his partner Bhagwan Singh in the Asian Games 2018. He is also serving in the Indian Army

Early life 
Rohit Kumar was born on 23 July 1996 in Fatehpur village of Ambala district, Haryana. His father is a farmer. He served in the Indian Army before starting a career in rowing.

Career 
He joined the army in 2012 and began rowing the same year at an army training camp in Roorkee. He won a bronze in the Asian Games 2018, in Jakarta.

Rohit Kumar won bronze at the Asian Games in 2018 paired with Bhagwan Singh.

These two scullers were selected after finishing first at the National Qualifying Regatta in Pune. He competes in men's lightweight double sculls paired with Bhagwan Singh.

References

Asian Games medalists in rowing
Rowers at the 2014 Asian Games
Rowers at the 2018 Asian Games
Medalists at the 2018 Asian Games
Asian Games gold medalists for India
Living people
Indian male rowers
1995 births